Caught in the Loop is the first album from the South African electronica/dance group Goldfish. It was released in 2006 by Black Mango Music in South Africa.

Track listing

References

2006 debut albums
Goldfish (band) albums